Wiercień may refer to the following places in Poland:
Wiercień, Lower Silesian Voivodeship (south-west Poland)
Wiercień, Podlaskie Voivodeship (north-east Poland)

See also